Purchasing power is the amount of goods and services that can be purchased with a unit of currency. For example, if one had taken one unit of currency to a store in the 1950s, it would have been possible to buy a greater number of items than would be the case today, indicating that the currency had a greater purchasing power in the 1950s.

If one's monetary income stays the same, but the price level increases, the purchasing power of that income amount falls. Inflation does not always imply falling purchasing power of one's money income since the latter may rise faster than the price level . A higher real income means a higher purchasing power of the income amount, since real income refers to the income adjusted for inflation.

Traditionally, the purchasing power of money depended heavily upon the local value of gold and silver, but was also made subject to the availability and demand of certain goods on the market. Most modern fiat currencies, like US dollars, are traded against each other and commodity money in the secondary market for the purpose of international transfer of payment for goods and services.

As Adam Smith noted, having money gives one the ability to "command" others' labor, so purchasing power to some extent is power over other people, to the extent that they are willing to trade their labor or goods for money or currency.

For a price index, its value in the base year is usually normalized to a value of 100. The purchasing power of a unit of currency, say a dollar, in a given year, expressed in dollars of the base year, is 100/P, where P is the price index in that year.  So, by definition, the purchasing power of a dollar decreases as the price level rises.

Adam Smith used an hour's labour as the purchasing power unit, so value would be measured in hours of labour required to produce a given quantity (or to produce some other good worth an amount sufficient to purchase the same). 

EUROSTAT defines purchasing power standard (PPS) as an artificial currency unit.

See also

 Big Mac Index
 Collective buying power
 Constant purchasing power accounting
 Consumer price index
 Consumerism
 Consumption (economics)
 Fair trade
 Free trade
 Group buying
 Group purchasing organization
 Measuring economic worth over time
 Purchasing power of the U.S. dollar
 Purchasing power parity

References

External links
 MeasuringWorth.com has a calculator with different measures for bringing values in Pound sterling from 1264 to the present and in US Dollars from 1774 up to any year until the present. The Measures of Worth page discusses which would be the most appropriate for different things.

 Purchasing Power Calculator by Fiona Maclachlan, The Wolfram Demonstrations Project.